Jenkins Correctional Facility is a privately operated, medium-security prison for men, owned and operated by CoreCivic under contract with the Georgia Department of Corrections.  The facility was built in 2012 in Millen, Jenkins County, Georgia,.

The maximum capacity of the prison is 1150 inmates.

References

Prisons in Georgia (U.S. state)
Buildings and structures in Jenkins County, Georgia
CoreCivic
2012 establishments in Georgia (U.S. state)